The 1998 UEFA Women's Under-18 Championship was held between 11 July 1998 and 18 July 1998. It was the first edition of the UEFA European Women's Under-18 Championship. 26 teams competed in the preliminary rounds. Denmark defeated France 4–3 on aggregate in the final.

Final

First leg

Second leg

Denmark won 4–3 on aggregate.

References

External links

Tournament history page UEFA.com
Tournament and qualifying results. RSSSF.com

UEFA Women's Under-19 Championship
1998 in women's association football
1998 in youth association football
1997–98 in European football